Lycée Camille Claudel may refer to:

Schools in the Paris area:
 Lycée Camille Claudel - Mantes-la-Ville
 Lycée Camille Claudel - Palaiseau
 Lycée Camille Claudel - Vauréal
 Lycée Camille-Claudel - Vitry-sur-Seine

Schools outside of the Paris area:
 Lycée professionnel Camille Claudel - Caen
 Lycée Camille Claudel - Digoin
 Lycée professionnel Camille Claudel - Lyon
 Lycée Camille Claudel - Pontault-Combault
 Lycée professionnel Camille Claudel - Remiremont
 Lycée Camille Claudel - Troyes